Bhabanipur Assembly constituency may refer to 

 Bhabanipur, Assam Assembly constituency
 Bhabanipur, West Bengal Assembly constituency